, known in North America as Wings of Wor, is a 1991 scrolling shooter video game developed by Masaya and published by NCS Corporation for the Sega Genesis. The game was released in North America and Europe in 1991 and in Japan on January 25, 1991, and re-released on the Wii Virtual Console exclusively in Japan on May 20, 2008, and was re-released for the Nintendo Switch, PlayStation 4 and Xbox One on November 12, 2021.

Plot 
The heavens are being attacked by the demons of Iccus, led by a being known only as the Destroyer. The angel Wor must bring the fight to Iccus itself and put an end to the Destroyer's dark plans.

Development

Reception 

Mean Machines magazine reviewed the title, giving it 88%.

MegaTech 5 magazine praised the power-ups and the graphics used for the bosses.

References

External links 
 

1991 video games
Horizontally scrolling shooters
Masaya Games games
Sega Genesis games
Virtual Console games for Wii
Nintendo Switch games
PlayStation 4 games
Xbox One games
Video games scored by Noriyuki Iwadare
Video games developed in Japan
Single-player video games